Kostrzyna may refer to the following places in Poland:
Kostrzyna, Lower Silesian Voivodeship (south-west Poland)
Kostrzyna, Gmina Panki in Silesian Voivodeship (south Poland)
Kostrzyna, Gmina Przystajń in Silesian Voivodeship (south Poland)